Jack Compton (born 1988) is an English footballer.

Jack Compton may also refer to:

 Jack Compton (baseball) (1882–1974)
 Jack Compton (Australian footballer) (1918–?)

See also
John Compton (disambiguation)